Elvet was a hundred, a geographic division, in the northwest of the traditional county of Carmarthenshire, Wales.

Boundaries

Extent of the Elvet Hundreds

A. Aber-Nant, B.  Abergwili, D. Cenarth, E. Cilrhedyn, F. Conwil Elfed, G. Llangeler, H Llanllawddog, J. Llanpumsaint, K. Merthyr, L. Newchurch, M. Pen-Boyr, P. Tre-Lech a'r Betws

Hundreds of Carmarthenshire
Districts of Carmarthenshire